Alessandro Mori Nunes or simply Alessandro (born 10 January 1979) is a Brazilian former professional footballer.

Honours
Flamengo
Campeonato Carioca: 1999, 2000, 2001
Copa do Brasil: 2001

Dynamo Kyiv
Ukrainian Premier League: 2004
Ukrainian Cup: 2005

Grêmio
Campeonato Brasileiro Série B: 2005
Campeonato Gaúcho: 2006

Santos
Campeonato Paulista: 2007

Corinthians
Campeonato Brasileiro Série B: 2008
Campeonato Paulista: 2009,2013
Copa do Brasil: 2009
Campeonato Brasileiro Série A: 2011
Copa Libertadores: 2012
FIFA Club World Cup: 2012
Recopa Sudamericana: 2013

References

Statistics 

 1 Included 5 games and 3 goal in Copa Rio 1998.
 2 Included 2 games in Torneio Rio – São Paulo 2000.
 3 Included 1 games and 1 goal in Torneio Rio – São Paulo and 5 games in Copa dos Campeões 2001.
 4 Included 5 games and 1 goal in Torneio Rio – São Paulo and 5 games in Copa dos Campeões 2002.

FIFA Club World Cup

External links
 santos.globo.com
 sambafoot
 CBF

1979 births
Living people
Brazilian footballers
Brazilian expatriate footballers
CR Flamengo footballers
Sociedade Esportiva Palmeiras players
FC Dynamo Kyiv players
Cruzeiro Esporte Clube players
Grêmio Foot-Ball Porto Alegrense players
Santos FC players
Copa Libertadores-winning players
Expatriate footballers in Ukraine
Sport Club Corinthians Paulista players
Campeonato Brasileiro Série A players
Ukrainian Premier League players
Brazilian expatriate sportspeople in Ukraine
Association football defenders